Flight 87 of the North American X-15 was a sub-orbital spaceflight conducted by NASA and the US Air Force on 27 June 1963. The X-15 was piloted by astronaut Robert A. Rushworth to an altitude of 86.7 km (53.9 mi) surpassing the U.S. definition of space. X-15 Flight 87 was NASA's first space vehicle. The Flight landed at Edwards Air Force Base. With this Rushworth was the first qualifying for his astronaut wings.

References

1963 in spaceflight
087